Eric Vonn is a Guatemalan telenovela writer known for his unique and "different" storylines. A hallmark of his work is that the villains aren't usually in love with the protagonist (a cliché motive for characters in the average telenovela and something for which they have been criticized) and that most of his telenovelas seem to center more on the villains and their stories instead of the "good guys." Furthermore, he has a reputation for creating memorable villains for the network, such as Marcia and Don Chema in Tierra de Pasiones, Doña Ágata, Inés, and Elena in Pecados Ajenos, the demon in La Chacala, and most recently, the disturbing character of Doña Loreto in Cielo Rojo.

Tierra de Pasiones and Pecados Ajenos, two of his latest novelas, could be considered modern-day retellings of William Shakespeare's Romeo and Juliet, especially the latter, and are of the tragicomedic genre. They were also known for their unusual and controversial series finales. Vonn's work, usually considered black comedy, is full of double entendres, puns, violent scenes, explicit sex scenes, and satirical and sarcastic takes on Christianity. For example, in Pecados Ajenos, the villain Ágata would always ask the Virgin Mary that her latest murder go as planned and that her victim would go to hell. She would often say "As a Christian woman, I..." before saying something really un-Christian. This kind of dark humor and graphic scenes have caused his telenovelas to be aired in later time slots.

Additionally, Vonn's novelas greatly differ from other Hispanic writers' in that they typically take place in the United States and follow the lives of Hispanic-American characters facing contemporary issues, such as illegal immigration, LGBT acceptance among the conservative Hispanic community, difficulties getting into college, teenage drug abuse, sex, and subtle criticisms on religion.

Writing style
Vonn uses black humor in his latest telenovelas with Telemundo and Azteca. The dialogues are full of ironic, sarcastic phrases, full of allegories and cynicism; the mimics of the characters must be the same way. The situations — whether it's gore, murder, or violence — are full of black humor which causes viewers to have different emotions at the same time. His novelas normally feature much physical and verbal violence, full of nude erotic scenes specially featuring villains. They are very realistic and close-to-real-life characters with their actions.

Protagonists are not the "main characters" of the novela: They have almost the same percentage of the scenes as villains or estelars. The best proof of this type of work are his late timeslot telenovelas Pecados Ajenos with Telemundo, Cielo Rojo and Vivir a Destiempo with Azteca. Tierra de Pasiones with Telemundo and Quererte Así with Azteca are a bit lighter, especially the ultimate one, because of earlier timeslot.

Filmography

Telenovelas

References

External links

Year of birth missing (living people)
Living people
Mexican screenwriters
Telenovela writers
Male television writers
Mexican people of German descent